Osphya varians is a species of false darkling beetle in the family Melandryidae.

References

Further reading

External links

 

Melandryidae
Beetles described in 1866